Echo Peak is a mountain in the Sierra Nevada range to the west of Lake Tahoe on the border of the Desolation Wilderness in El Dorado County, California.

References 

Mountains of the Desolation Wilderness
Mountains of El Dorado County, California
Mountains of Northern California